Labour corps or labor corps may refer to:

 Labour Corps (British Army), a branch within the British Army during the First World War, a forerunner of the Royal Pioneer Corps
 Chinese Labour Corps or Corps de Travailleurs Chinois, civilian auxiliaries of the British and French militaries during the First World War
 Egyptian Labour Corps, a civilian auxiliary of the British military during the First World War
 Indian Labour Corps, unit of the First World War that supported the British military
 Maltese Labour Corps, unit of the First World War that supported the British military
 South African Native Labour Corps, unit of the First World War that supported the British military
 Solomon Islands Labour Corps, a civilian auxiliary of the British Solomon Islands Protectorate Defence Force during the Second World War
 Vanuatu Labor Corps, a civilian auxiliary consisting of New Hebrides natives which supported the American Army and Navy during the Second World War